Frannie Lindsay is an American poet. She is author of three poetry collections, most recently, The Snow's Wife (Cavankerry Press, 2020). Her honors include fellowships from the National Endowment for the Arts, the Massachusetts Cultural Council, the MacDowell and Millay Colonies, and Yaddo. Her poems have been published in literary journals and magazines including The Atlantic Monthly, The Yale Review, Black Warrior Review, The Georgia Review, The Southern Review, Southern Humanities Review, Field, Prairie Schooner, Poetry East, Beloit Poetry Journal, Harvard Review, and Hunger Mountain. Her poems have also been featured on Poetry Daily, and Verse Daily. Lindsay earned her B.A. from Russell Sage College and her M.F.A. from the Iowa Writers’ Workshop. She grew up in a musical family—her mother was a concert violinist—and she is a classical pianist and lives in Belmont, Massachusetts with her two dogs.

Published works
Full-Length Poetry Collections
 The Snow's Wife (Cavankerry Press, 2020)
 If Mercy (Word Works, 2016)
 Our Vanishing (Red Hen Press, 2014)
 Mayweed (Word Works, 2010)
 Lamb (Perugia Press, 2006)
 Where She Always Was (Utah State University Press, 2004)

Honors and awards
 2009 Washington Prize
 2006 Massachusetts Cultural Council Artist Fellowship
 2006 Perugia Press Prize
 2004 May Swenson Poetry Award

References

External links
 Audio: The Writer’s Almanac with Garrison Keillor > Poems by Frannie Lindsay
 Interview: Kicking Wind > Every Other Day > 21 July 2006 > Interview with Frannie Lindsay
 Author Page: Frannie Lindsay > Perugia Press
 Poem: AGNI Online > Relic by Frannie Lindsay
 Digital Book: Where She Was by Frannie Lindsay

Living people
Year of birth missing (living people)
Poets from Massachusetts
Russell Sage College alumni
Iowa Writers' Workshop alumni
University of Iowa alumni
National Endowment for the Arts Fellows
Place of birth missing (living people)
People from Belmont, Massachusetts
American women poets
21st-century American women